The DeQueen & Eastern Railroad Machine Shop is an historic railroad maintenance shop in De Queen, Arkansas.  It is located on the northwest corner of the railyard of the De Queen and Eastern Railroad, near the corner of South Hughes Street and East Lockesburg Avenue.  It is a tall and long single-story brick structure, with a monitor roof and modest Italianate styling.  Built c. 1905, it is one of the oldest surviving buildings built by this particular railroad company, and is the only known period railroad shop building in the region.

The building was listed on the National Register of Historic Places in 1996.

See also
National Register of Historic Places listings in Sevier County, Arkansas

References

Railway buildings and structures on the National Register of Historic Places in Arkansas
Italianate architecture in Arkansas
Buildings and structures completed in 1905
Buildings and structures in Sevier County, Arkansas
National Register of Historic Places in Sevier County, Arkansas
Railway workshops on the National Register of Historic Places
1905 establishments in Arkansas